Tymek is a Polish-language diminutive of the given name Tymoteusz, or Timothy (given name). It can be both a given name and a surname. Notable persons with this name include:

 (1919-1944), Polish World War II resistance fighter
 ( Tymoteusz Bucki ) (born 1994), Polish rapper
A sorcerer's apprentice from the Polish comics  Tymek i Mistrz